Big Night Without You is the fourth album released from the band emmet swimming. It combined elements of gospel, alternative rock, dark humor, wailing, and churning rock guitars.

Track listing

Personnel
Todd Watts - Vocals, Guitar
Erik Wenberg	- Guitar, backing vocals
Luke Michel - Bass
Tamer Eid - Drums
Peter Collins	- Producer
Paul David Hager - Engineer

References

Emmet Swimming albums
1998 albums